Lieutenant General Joshua Mahamadu Hamidu (1936 – 1 February 2021) was a Ghanaian soldier, politician and diplomat. He has been the Chief of Defence Staff and also member of the Supreme Military Council government. Prior to heading the military and being in government, he was the Ghanaian High Commissioner to Zambia. He was appointed National Security Advisor to the Kufuor government in 2001. He was the chairman of the Narcotics Control Board of Ghana and on various boards of the Bank of Ghana. In 2005, he was Ghana's High Commissioner to Nigeria.

Hamidu had been accused in some circles of being implicated in the killing of the King of Dagbon, the late Yaa-Naa, Yakubu II in March 2002. The Wuaku Commission which investigated the circumstances leading to the tragedy cleared him of any wrongdoing. He died on 1 February 2021 at the 37 Military Hospital in Accra.

References

1936 births
2021 deaths
Ghanaian royalty
Ghanaian soldiers
High Commissioners of Ghana to Zambia
High Commissioners of Ghana to Nigeria
People from Yendi
Dagbon royalty
Tamale Senior High School alumni